The men's 100 metres sprint event at the 1928 Summer Olympics in Amsterdam, Netherlands, were held at the Olympic Stadium on Sunday, 29 July and Monday, 30 July. Eighty-one runners entered, though ultimately seventy-six runners from 32 nations competed. NOCs were limited to 4 competitors each. The event was won by Percy Williams of Canada, taking the nation's first men's 100 metres gold medal. Jack London of Great Britain took silver, marking the third consecutive Games that Great Britain had a medalist in the event. Georg Lammers won bronze, Germany's first medal in the event since 1896. For the first time in modern Olympic history, the United States won no medals in the event.

Background

This was the eighth time the event was held, having appeared at every Olympics since the first in 1896. None of the 1924 finalists competed (bronze medalist Arthur Porritt entered, but did not start). Notable entrants included Frank Wykoff, winner of the U.S. Olympic trials and by default one of the favorites in a field that was "considered to be wide-open"; Great Britain's Jack London, and Germany's Georg Lammers.

Cuba, Lithuania, and Romania were represented in the event for the first time. The United States was the only nation to have appeared at each of the first eight Olympic men's 100 metres events.

Competition format

The event retained the four round format from 1920 and 1924: heats, quarterfinals, semifinals, and a final. There were 16 heats, of 3–6 athletes each, with the top 2 in each heat advancing to the quarterfinals. The 32 quarterfinalists were placed into 6 heats of 5 or 6 athletes. Again, the top 2 advanced. There were 2 heats of 6 semifinalists, this time with the top 3 advancing to the 6-man final.

Records
These are the standing world and Olympic records (in seconds) prior to the 1928 Summer Olympics.

Percy Williams equalized the standing Olympic record with 10.6 seconds in the fourth heat of the second round. In the first semifinal, Williams, Robert McAllister, and Wilfred Legg all equalized the record.

Results

First round
Sixteen heats were held, the two fastest of each qualified for the second round.

Heat 1

Heat 2

Heat 3

 
(*) Some sources credit the third place to Gómez Daza and list Boot in fourth. (The official report did not show the ranking.)

Heat 4

Heat 5

Heat 6

Heat 7

Heat 8

Heat 9

Heat 10

Heat 11

Heat 12

Heat 13

Heat 14

Heat 15

Heat 16

Quarterfinals
Six heats were held, the two fastest of each qualified for the semifinals.

Quarterfinal 1

Quarterfinal 2

Quarterfinal 3

Quarterfinal 4

Quarterfinal 5

Quarterfinal 6

Semifinals

Two semifinals were held, the three fastest of each qualified for the final.

Semifinal 1

Semifinal 2

Final

There were two false starts, by Legg and Wykoff. Once the final successfully started, Williams took the early lead and never relinquished it.

References

External links
 Official Report
 Results
 De Wael

1
100 metres at the Olympics
Men's events at the 1928 Summer Olympics